Henry Marchant (April 9, 1741 – August 30, 1796) was a Founding Father of the United States, an attorney general of Rhode Island, a delegate to the Second Continental Congress from Rhode Island, a signer of the Articles of Confederation, and the first United States district judge of the United States District Court for the District of Rhode Island.

Education and career

Born on April 9, 1741, in Martha's Vineyard, Province of Massachusetts Bay, British America, Marchant received an Artium Magister degree in 1762 from the College of Philadelphia (now the University of Pennsylvania) and read law in 1776. He entered private practice in Newport from 1767 to 1777. He was attorney general of Rhode Island from 1771 to 1777. He was a delegate to the Second Continental Congress from 1777 to 1779. He was one of the signers of the Articles of Confederation. He resumed private practice in South Kingstown, Rhode Island, from 1780 to 1784, also engaging in farming. He was a member of the Rhode Island House of Representatives from 1784 to 1790. He was a member of the Rhode Island convention to adopt the United States Constitution, which ultimately was adopted by a separate convention in 1790.

Federal judicial service

He was confirmed by the United States Senate on July 3, 1790, and received his commission the same day. His service terminated when he died on August 30, 1796, in Newport. He was interred in the Common Burial Ground in Newport.

Notable case

Marchant presided over West v. Barnes (1791), which was the first case appealed to the Supreme Court of the United States.

Church and farm

Marchant was a member of Second Congregational Church of Newport. His farm, the Henry Marchant Farm, is located in South Kingstown.

Note

References

Further reading

 Lovejoy, David S. "Henry Marchant and the Mistress of the World." William and Mary Quarterly 3d ser., 12 (July 1955): 375–98.

Sources

 

1741 births
1796 deaths
Continental Congressmen from Rhode Island
18th-century American politicians
Judges of the United States District Court for the District of Rhode Island
People from Martha's Vineyard, Massachusetts
Politicians from Newport, Rhode Island
People from South Kingstown, Rhode Island
Rhode Island Attorneys General
People of colonial Rhode Island
Signers of the Articles of Confederation
United States federal judges appointed by George Washington
18th-century American judges
University of Pennsylvania alumni
Burials at Common Burying Ground and Island Cemetery
United States federal judges admitted to the practice of law by reading law
Founding Fathers of the United States